Events from the year 2016 in Nepal

Incumbents
President: Bidhya Devi Bhandari
Vice President: Nanda Kishor Pun
Prime Minister: Khadga Prasad Oli (until 4 August), Pushpa Kamal Dahal (starting 4 August)

Events

January
 4 January - 2016 Imphal Earthquake

February
 26 February - 2016 Air Kasthamandap crash

Deaths
9 February - Sushil Koirala, former Prime Minister (b. 1939)
7 June - Amber Gurung, musician (b. 1938)
27 August - Gore Bahadur Khapangi, former Minister (b. 1940)
16 September - Madhav Ghimire, former Home Minister and Chief Secretary
29 December - Kamal Mani Dixit, litterateur (b. 1929)

References

 
2010s in Nepal
Years of the 21st century in Nepal
Nepal
Nepal